The 1968 William & Mary Indians football team was an American football team that represented the College of William & Mary as a member of the Southern Conference (SoCon) during the 1968 NCAA University Division football season. In their fifth season under head coach Marv Levy, William & Mary compiled a 3–7 record, with a mark of 2–2 in conference play, placing tied for third in the SoCon.

Schedule

References

William and Mary
William & Mary Tribe football seasons
William